The first season of Phineas and Ferb aired on Disney Channel from August 17, 2007 to February 18, 2009. The series introduces two step-brothers on summer vacation trying to make every day the best day ever, while their sister tries to bust them. The five main characters are brothers Phineas Flynn and Ferb Fletcher, their older sister Candace Flynn, secret agent Perry the Platypus, and the evil Dr. Heinz Doofenshmirtz.

Recurring characters are across-the-street neighbor Isabella Garcia-Shapiro, the boys' mom Linda Flynn-Fletcher, the boys’ dad Lawrence Fletcher, Perry's boss Major Monogram, Candace's crush Jeremy Johnson, Baljeet, Buford Van Stomm, Candace's best friend Stacy Hirano, and many more.

Production

Writing style
The show uses four major writers to devise story ideas according to "strict guidelines", such as that the boys' schemes never appear to be "magical". Stories are reviewed at weekly sessions on a Monday, then simultaneously scripted and story-boarded. A very rough design is built before the storyboard, featuring little more than suggested scenes and dialogue, is drafted; the writers then gather for a "play-by-play" walk-through of the storyboard in front of the whole crew, whose reactions to the jokes are assessed before rewrites are made. The writers as well include running gags in every episode, which are generally lines spoken by characters. Almost every episode is set into two eleven-minute segments.

Cast
Phineas and Ferb are voiced by Vincent Martella and Thomas Sangster, respectively. Sangster was one of many British actors cast; Marsh lived in the United Kingdom for seven years, and developed a fondness for its people. The rest of the cast includes Ashley Tisdale as their sister, Candace, Dee Bradley Baker as the secret agent platypus, Perry, Caroline Rhea as the mother, Linda Flynn-Fletcher, Richard O’Brien as the father Lawrence Fletcher, Kelly Hu as Candace's best friend Stacy, and Alyson Stoner as Phineas and Ferb's next-door neighbor and best friend Isabella. Creators Dan Povenmire and Jeff "Swampy" Marsh are uncredited as the voices of Dr. Doofenshmirtz and Major Monogram, respectively.

Episodes

Ratings
The first episode, "Rollercoaster," garnered a total of 10.8 million viewers when aired as a preview on August 17, 2007. When Phineas and Ferb officially debuted in February the next year, it proved cable's number one watched animated series premiere by "tweens". Throughout the first quarter that followed, it peaked as the top-rated animated series for ages 6–10 and 9–14, also becoming number three animated series for all of cable television for viewers age 6–10. By the time the commissioning of the second season was announced in May 2008, the series had become a top-rated program in the 6–11 and 9–14 age groups.

DVD releases

Notes

References

General references

External links 

2007 American television seasons
2008 American television seasons
2009 American television seasons